Longest Year is the fourth EP by American ambient band Hammock. It was released on December 14, 2010 by the band's own label, Hammock Music.

Reception

Longest Year met with positive critical reception. Heather Phares of Allmusic noted that "Longest Year marks a distinct departure from Chasing After Shadows... Living with the Ghosts more structured, percussive tracks; these reveries float and glide all the more majestically for their almost complete lack of beats... The Longest Year's beauty is undeniable." Ryan Burleson, writing for Consequence of Sound, noted that the album "transmits more hope and transcendence than any amount of darkness gleaned from the title."

Track listing

References

External links
Longest Year available for streaming at the official Hammock website

Hammock (band) albums
Hammock Music albums
2010 albums